Bond Clothing Stores, Bond Clothes, Bond Clothiers, or Bond Stores, was a men's clothing manufacturing company and retailer.  The company catered to the middle-class consumer.

History
The company was founded in Cleveland, Ohio in 1914, when Mortimer Slater, with Charles Anson Bond and Lester Cohen, founded the stores as a retail outlet for their suit manufacturing company. Charles Anson Bond, whose name was chosen for its market value and meaning left Cleveland for Columbus, Ohio where he opened a branch of the company.  Bond stepped away from active management when he was elected mayor of Columbus in 1907.  The first store featured fifteen-dollar men's suits. As president, Slater built the concern into a million-dollar corporation, increasing the number of employees from 50 to more than 4,000. At his retirement in 1924, the concern had 28 stores in large cities. Charles Anson Bond also sold his interests in the 1920s. Bond Stores, Inc. was organized in Maryland on March 19, 1937, by the consolidation of Bond Clothing Company, a Maryland corporation, and its subsidiary, Bond Stores, Inc. The principal executive offices of the corporation were located at 261 Fifth Avenue in New York City.

During the 1930s and 1940s, it became the largest retail chain of men's clothing in the United States, best known for selling two-pant suits.  In 1975, the company was sold to foreign investors, then broken up and sold in smaller groups to its management.  For instance, 13 stores were operated by the Proud Wind, Inc. company.

Manufacturing operations
In 1933, company president Barney S. Ruben (1885–1959) moved the manufacturing center of Bond Clothes from New Brunswick, New Jersey to Rochester, New York where he spent his youth and got his start in the clothing industry with Fashion Park Clothes.  By the end of the 1930s, the manufacturer grew to employ over 2,500 people. During the 1940s the company expanded to larger manufacturing facilities on North Goodman St.  In 1956, wholly owned manufacturing plants operated at New Brunswick, New York City, and Rochester.  The Rochester facility was later sold to General Dynamics and is now occupied by Bausch and Lomb contact lens manufacturing.  The company's manufacturing facilities remained in Rochester until 1979, when the factory was finally closed.

Retail stores
Bond Stores operated numerous retail outlets in the United States. Principally a men's clothier, by the mid-1950s some stores also carried women's clothing and later became known as "family apparel centers."  In 1956, the chain operated nearly 100 outlets from coast to coast in principal cities, in addition to more than 50 agency stores that sold goods in smaller communities.  In the late 1960s there were around 150 retail outlets.  By 1982, that number had dwindled to 50.
Around 1970, new management knowledgeable in fashions took over Bond Clothes, but their knowledge of the retail clothing industry did nothing to save Bond Clothes from its eventual demise.

New York City
Its New York City flagship store was at 372 Fifth Avenue at 35th Street, the former flagship of Best & Co.  Known as "Bond Fifth Avenue," they began leasing the store and the adjoining 12-story office tower from Best & Co. in 1947. In 1948, Bond renovated the entire building with ultra-modern interiors under the direction of designer Morris Lapidus. Bond stayed in the building until the mid-1970s. The building has most recently been redeveloped by the Paratis Group as a commercial / residential complex known as the "372 Fifth Avenue Loft."

The company also operated a store at Times Square. That outlet opened in 1940, was dubbed "the cathedral of clothing."  The store closed in 1977. Starting in 1980, the building was a dance club called Bond International Casino, notable for hosting a concert by The Clash in 1981. The building housed a restaurant called Bond 45 until December 2015. The site currently houses a GAP and Old Navy since 2017.

Greater Los Angeles
Bond's built its nine-story Los Angeles flagship in what was then the city's primary shopping district, at 640 S. Broadway in 1939. That flagship is now the Pavo Real Jewelry Center, but the large Bond sign still runs down the vertical length of the building. By 1960 the chain had stores on Wilshire Boulevard's Miracle Mile, Crenshaw Center, and Hollywood Boulevard; in Anaheim Plaza, the El Monte Shopping Center, on Whittier Boulevard in East Los Angeles, Brand Bouelvard in Glendale, in Huntington Park, Lakewood Center,  Valley Plaza in North Hollywood, Panorama City Shopping Center, Eastland Shopping Center in West Covina, and  Westchester.

Washington, D.C., and vicinity
Bond Stores first entered the Washington, D.C., market in 1925. In Washington, D.C., the local flagship store was at 1335 F Street, NW, in the heart of the downtown shopping district. It opened in the early 1930s and closed in January 1982.

Suburban locations in Northern Virginia operated at Landmark Mall in Alexandria (opened 1966) and Seven Corners Shopping Center in Falls Church (opened October 1956, closed 1976).  Outlets in suburban Maryland operated at Montgomery Mall in Bethesda, Prince George's Plaza in Hyattsville (opened 1959, closed ca. 1982), and Marlow Heights Shopping Center at Marlow Heights.

Cleveland, Ohio
During the late 1940s, Bond built one of its last stand alone downtown stores. Designed in a high concept art moderne style in Cleveland at Euclid Avenue and East Ninth Street in 1946/7.  The structure replaced a previous building built in 1920.  The structure used the site's sharp angle to its advantage by creating a tower crowned with windows facing inbound Euclid Avenue traffic".  The circular forms of the tower were repeated in the roof's overhang. On the Euclid Avenue and East Ninth Street facades, open gill-like projections held vertical window columns facing east and south. The building was faced with rose granite sheets and the BOND name was illuminated in red neon.  Inside, the round themes were repeated in ceiling moldings, mirrors, and plaster reliefs. Following Bond's closure, the structure stood for many years until it was razed in the 1970s.

Chicago, Illinois
240 S State Street, 1954 +

Buffalo, New York
Bond Stores operated at least two locations in the Buffalo, New York area.  In 1940, they took over the Givens, Inc. women's and children's apparel store at 452-54 Main Street in downtown Buffalo.  A suburban location opened in 1962, at the new Boulevard Mall.

Dallas, Texas
Two Bond Stores were located at 1500 Main Street (Southwestern Life Insurance Building) and 1530 Main Street, now The Joule Hotel. Also in the 1960's - 1970's, there was a Bond Store in North Park Mall, 8687 N US 75-Central Expressway.

Times Square sign

Between 1948 and 1954, Bond Clothes operated a massive sign on the east side block of Broadway between 44th and 45th streets in New York's Times Square. The sign had nearly 2 miles of neon and included two 7-story-tall nude figures, a man and a woman, as bookends. Beneath the waterfall was a  zipper sign with scrolling messages. The Bond zipper was made up of more than 20,000 light bulbs. Above the waterfall was a digital clock with the wording "Every Hour 3,490 People Buy at Bond." Some of the sign remained in place to advertise the Bond Stores location until the store's closure in 1977.

References

External links
New York Architecture Images- Midtown (Times Square) includes postcards showing Times Square Bond Clothes sign (accessed September 16, 2008).
Photograph of Forrester Building, 640 S. Broadway, Los Angeles, California (home of Bond Clothing Stores, Inc., ca. 1939 to 1973) (accessed September 16, 2008).

Defunct retail companies of the United States
Clothing manufacturers
American companies established in 1914
Retail companies established in 1914
Clothing companies established in 1914
Retail companies disestablished in 1989
Companies based in New York City
Defunct companies based in New York City
Retail companies based in New York City